1967 college football season may refer to:

 1967 NCAA University Division football season
 1967 NCAA College Division football season
 1967 NAIA football season